Last Days of Humanity is a Dutch goregrind band that was active from 1989 until 2006, and reformed in 2010. Its music is known for its nonstop sound and relentless blast beats, with regards to drummer Marc Palmen.

The band has been recognized as one of the most notable grind acts in the Dutch music scene.

History
Erwin de Wit and Hans Smits often came together in Soos Plock, where they socialised and saw bands like Blood, Agathocles, Dreft and other bands who were into grindcore/noisecore at that time. It also was the heyday of some other underground bands such as Fear of God, Napalm Death, Sore Throat, Anal Cunt, and 7 Minutes of Nausea. These bands inspired them to go and start their own grind/noise band.

Erwin was in a grindcore band called Fatal Error prior to joining Last Days of Humanity. When Erwin organised a gig with Drudge, Agathocles and some other bands on December 30, 1989, in Plock, he saw the opportunity to add their own noise project to the bill, and Last Days of Humanity was born.

Last Days of Humanity at this time consisted of only two vocalists (Erwin and Hans). Their music was originally crafted by using two screaming voices that were deformed by a pitch shifter intended for guitar. In 1990, a more traditional band setup was formed when the first real gig of Last Days of Humanity was planned. They were scheduled to play on October 6, 1990, together with Fatal Error at Soos Plock.

In 1993, the band went into the studio to record their second demo. In 1996, they got their first record deal. Afterwards, they booked 2 studio days to record their first album. After one day recording they only recorded approximately 12 minutes of music. Their label then informed the band that they had to come up with 18 additional minutes of new material in 24 hours, or the album would not be released. After this dispute, they quickly moved to Bones Brigade. The band split up in 2006.

Bones Brigade announced that Last Days of Humanity officially reformed. The band appeared at Bloodshed Fest 2010 at the Dynamo club in Eindhoven, Netherlands, Maryland Deathfest 2011 at Sonar in Baltimore, and toured the United Kingdom in December 2011. They also appeared at Hellfest 2011 in Clisson, France, and Obscene Extreme 2011 in Czech Republic.

Last Days of Humanity released their fifth full-length album Horrific Compositions of Decomposition in March 2021, their first album released in 15 years.

Members

Current members
 Hans Smits – vocals (1989-1997, 2020-)
Bas van Geffen - bass, guitar (2003-2004, 2006, 2020-)
Paul Niessen - drums (2020-)

Former members
Erwin de Wit - bass, drums (1989-1992, 1996-2003, 2010-2011)
Dennis Dekkers - bass (1992-1993)
Glenn Jagers - drums (1993-1997)
Martie van Sinten - bass (1994-1995)
Mark Snijders - guitar (1994-1995)
Anne van de Burgt - guitar (1996-1998)
Rutger Noij - drums (1998)
Bart Boumans - vocals (1998-2000)
Marc Palmen - drums (1998-2006), vocals (2010-2011)
Boris Cornelissen - vocals (2000)
Erwin de Groot - vocals (2001-2005)
Rogier Kuzee – bass (2002-2006, 2010-?)
Melanie Stamp - bass (2010-2014)
William Van De Ven - guitar (2010-?)
Joep Van Raak - drums (2010-2011)

Discography

Albums 
 1998 – The Sound of Rancid Juices Sloshing Around Your Coffin (Bones Brigade Records, 2013 LP on Fat Ass Records)
 2000 – Hymns of Indigestible Suppuration (Bones Brigade Records, 2014 Picture LP on Fat Ass Records)
 2006 – Putrefaction in Progress (Bones Brigade Records, 2015 LP on Fat Ass Records)
 2021 - Horrific Compositions of Decomposition (Rotten Roll Rex)

EPs 
 2005 – In Advanced Haemorrhaging Conditions (Bones Brigade Records, 2016 vinyl on Fat Ass Records)
 2019 – The Complicated Reflex and Depraved Scent of the Retrograde Reflux in Formula (Bizarre Leprous Production)

Demos 
 1992 – Last Days of Humanity
 1993 – Human Atrocity (2010 LP on State Fucker Records)

Splits 
 1994 – Split with Vulgar Degenerate
 1995 – Pathological Dreams (split with Confessions of Obscurity)
 1996 – Defleshed by Flies (split with Rakitis) (Morbid Records)
 2000 – Split up for Better Digestion (split with Morgue) (Evil Biker Records)
 2001 – Choked in Anal Mange (split with Cock and Ball Torture) (Fleshfeast Records / Unmatched Brutality)
 2001 – 138 Minutes Body Disposal (split with Stoma)
 2003 – Dutch Assault (split with Suppository, S.M.E.S. and Inhume) (Relapse Records)
 2004 – Split with Lymphatic Phlegm (Black Hole Productions)
 2012 - Split with Necrocannibalistic Vomitorium
 2017 - Split with F.U.B.A.R.

Other 
 2001 – Comeback of Goregods: Tribute to Regurgitate (compilation) (Bizarre Leprous Production)
 2004 – The XTC of Swallowing L.D.O.H. Faeces (live album) (Bones Brigade Records)
 2007 – Rest in Gore 1989–2006 (Bones Brigade Records)
 2012 - Goresurrection (Grind Block Records)

External links
Facebook
Bones Brigade Records

References

Dutch rock music groups
Dutch heavy metal musical groups
Grindcore musical groups
Goregrind musical groups
Musical groups established in 1989
Musical groups disestablished in 2006
Musical quartets